Marcel Engelhardt (born 5 April 1993) is a German professional footballer who plays as a goalkeeper for FSV Zwickau.

Career
In January 2021 Engelhardt left 2. Bundesliga club Eintracht Braunschweig to join Maritzburg United of the Premier Soccer League.

References

External links
 

1993 births
Living people
People from Steinfurt (district)
Sportspeople from Münster (region)
Footballers from North Rhine-Westphalia
German footballers
Association football goalkeepers
VfB Lübeck players
TSV Havelse players
Eintracht Braunschweig II players
Eintracht Braunschweig players
Maritzburg United F.C. players
FSV Zwickau players
2. Bundesliga players
Regionalliga players
3. Liga players
German expatriate footballers
Expatriate soccer players in South Africa
German expatriate sportspeople in South Africa